Annemarie Bischofberger (born 29 January 1960 in Oberegg District) is a Swiss former alpine skier who competed in the 1980 Winter Olympics.

External links
 sports-reference.com
 

1960 births
Living people
Swiss female alpine skiers
Olympic alpine skiers of Switzerland
Alpine skiers at the 1980 Winter Olympics
People from Appenzell Innerrhoden
Annemarie
20th-century Swiss women